Brasley Bridge or Trumpington Bridge is the first river Cam bridge on its upstream in Cambridge. It is located near Grantchester Road and connects Grantchester and Trumpington.

History 
1790 - the first wooden bridge near the ford replaced a brick construction 
1954 - reconstructed for cars
2015 - from February to September 2015 it was reconstructed using the reinforced concrete

See also
List of bridges in Cambridge
Template:River Cam map

References

Bridges in Cambridge
Bridges completed in 2015
Bridges across the River Cam
Concrete bridges in England
Road bridges in England
Beam bridges in England
Trumpington
Grantchester